The 1946 Iowa State Senate elections took place as part of the biennial 1946 United States elections. Iowa voters elected state senators in 23 of the state senate's 50 districts. State senators serve four-year terms in the Iowa State Senate.

A statewide map of the 50 state Senate districts in the 1946 elections is provided by the Iowa General Assembly here.

The primary election on June 3, 1946 determined which candidates appeared on the November 5, 1946 general election ballot.

Following the previous election, Republicans had control of the Iowa state Senate with 45 seats to Democrats' 5 seats.

To claim control of the chamber from Republicans, the Democrats needed to net 21 Senate seats.

Republicans maintained control of the Iowa State Senate following the 1946 general election with the balance of power shifting to Republicans holding 46 seats and Democrats having 4 seats (a net gain of 1 seat for Republicans).

Summary of Results
Note: The 27 holdover Senators not up for re-election are not listed on this table.

Source:

Detailed Results
NOTE: The 27 districts that did not hold elections in 1946 are not listed here.

Note: If a district does not list a primary, then that district did not have a competitive primary (i.e., there may have only been one candidate file for that district).

District 1

District 6

District 7

District 9

District 10

District 12

District 13

District 16

District 18

District 20

District 21

District 22

District 29

District 30

District 34

District 35

District 37

Senator Hill resigned from the Senate before being sworn in to another term. This necessitated a special election.

District 38

District 42

District 44

District 45

District 48

District 50

See also
 United States elections, 1946
 United States House of Representatives elections in Iowa, 1946
 Elections in Iowa

References

1946 Iowa elections
Iowa Senate
Iowa Senate elections